Soraya Titawasira, better known by her stage name Smile The Star 8, is a Thai singer and actress. She is under contract with GMM Grammy record label Exact. She became famous during her appearance in season 8 of the television program The Star.

Filmography

TV Dramas

TV Series

TV Sitcom

Film

Master of Ceremony: MC

Television 
 20 : ทุกวัน เวลา น. On Air

Online 
 2018 : - On Air YouTube:Smile Parada

Music video

Discography

Songs

Drama Series Songs

Live shows

Stage play

Concert

References 

1996 births
Living people
Parada Thitawachira
Parada Thitawachira
Parada Thitawachira
Parada Thitawachira
Thai television personalities
Parada Thitawachira
Parada Thitawachira